A toxic leader is a person who has responsibility for a group of people or an organization, and who abuses the leader–follower relationship by leaving the group or organization in a worse condition than it was in.
Marcia Lynn Whicker popularized the term "toxic leader" in 1996;

In his 1994 journal article "Petty Tyranny in Organizations" Blake Ashforth discussed potentially destructive sides of leadership and identified what he referred to as "petty tyrants", i.e. leaders who exercise a tyrannical style of management, resulting in a climate of fear in the workplace.

Basic traits 
The basic traits of a toxic leader are generally considered to be either/or insular, intemperate, glib, operationally rigid, callous, inept, discriminatory, corrupt or aggressive by scholars such as Barbara Kellerman.

Aggressive narcissism 
This syndrome is also the 'Factor 1' in Robert D.Hare's Psychopathy Checklist, which includes the following traits:

 Glibness/superficial charm
 Grandiose sense of self-worth
 Pathological lying
 Cunning/manipulative
 Lack of remorse or guilt
 Callous/lack of empathy
 Shallow emotional affect (genuine emotion is short-lived and egocentric)
 Failure to accept responsibility for own actions

Other traits 

The United States Army defines toxic leaders as commanders who put their own needs first, micro-manage subordinates, behave in a mean-spirited manner or display poor decision-making. A study for the Center for Army Leadership found that toxic leaders in the army work to promote themselves at the expense of their subordinates, and usually do so without considering long-term ramifications to their subordinates, their unit, and the Army profession.

Ashforth proposed the following six characteristics to define petty tyranny:
 arbitrariness and self-aggrandizement
 belittling of subordinates
 lack of consideration for others
 a forcing style of conflict resolution
 discouragement of initiative
 noncontingent use of punishment: that is, punishment (e.g. displeasure or criticism) allotted without discernible or consistent principles; not dependent on, or necessarily associated with, undesirable behaviors.

Tools 
 Workload: The  setting up to fail procedure is in particular a well established workplace bullying tactic that a toxic leader can use against his rivals and subordinates.
 Corporate control systems: They could use the processes in place to monitor what is going on. Disciplinary systems could be abused to aid their power culture.
 Organizational structures: They could abuse the hierarchies, personal relationships and the way that work flows through the business.
 Corporate power structures: The toxic leader controls who, if any one makes the decisions and how widely spread power is.
 Symbols of personal authority : These may include the right to parking spaces and executive washrooms or access to supplies and uniforms. Narcissistic symbols and self-images (i.e. workplace full of self-portraits).
 Workplace rituals and routines: Management meetings, board reports, disciplinary hearing, performance assays and so on may become more habitual than necessary.

Heavy running costs and a high staff turnover/overtime rate are often also associated with employee related results of a toxic leader.

Key theorists

Jean Lipman-Blumen 

In their book, The Allure of Toxic Leaders: Why We Follow Destructive Bosses and Corrupt Politicians—and How We Can Survive Them, Jean Lipman-Blumen explained that there was and still is a tendency among contemporary society to seek authoritative, even dominating characteristics among our corporate and political leaders because of the public's own personal psycho-social needs and emotional weaknesses.

Lipman-Blumen noticed "toxic leadership" was not about run-of-the-mill mismanagement. Rather, it referred to leaders, who, by virtue of their "dysfunctional personal characteristics" and "destructive behaviours" "inflict reasonably serious and enduring harm" not only on their own followers and organizations, but on others outside of their immediate circle of victims and subordinates, as well. A noted rule of thumb suggests that toxic leaders leave their followers and others who come within their sphere of influence worse off than they found them either on a personal and/or corporate basis.

Lipman-Blumens' core focus was on investigating why people will continue to follow and remain loyal to toxic leaders. She also explored why followers often vigorously resist change and challenges to leaders who have clearly violated the leader/follower relationship and abused their power as leaders to the direct detriment of the people they are leading. Lipman-Blumen suggests there is something of a deeply psychological nature going on. She argues the need to feel safe, specialness and in a social community all help explain this psychological phenomenon.

Barbara Kellerman 

In Bad Leadership: What It Is, How It Happens, Why It Matters, Barbara Kellerman suggests that toxicity in leadership (or simply, "bad leadership") may be analysed into seven different types:
 Incompetent – the leader and at least some followers lack the will or skill (or both) to sustain effective action. With regard to at least one important leadership challenge, they do not create positive change.
 Rigid – the leader and at least some followers are stiff and unyielding. Although they may be competent, they are unable or unwilling to adapt to new ideas, new information, or changing times.
 Intemperate – the leader lacks self-control and is aided and abetted by followers who are unwilling or unable to effectively intervene.
 Callous – the leader and at least some followers are uncaring or unkind. Ignored and discounted are the needs, wants, and wishes of most members of the group or organization, especially subordinates.
 Corrupt – the leader and at least some followers lie, cheat, or steal. To a degree that exceeds the norm, they put self-interest ahead of the public interest.
 Insular – the leader and at least some followers minimize or disregard the health and welfare of those outside the group or organization for which they are directly responsible.
 Evil – the leader and at least some followers commit atrocities. They use pain as an instrument of power. The harm can be physical, psychological or both.

Terry Price 
In his book, Understanding Ethical Failures in Leaders, Terry L. Price argues that the volitional account of moral failures in leaders do not provide a complete account of this phenomenon. Some have suggested that the reason leaders misbehave ethically is because they willingly go against what they know to be wrong. Professor Price however, offers an alternative analysis of leaders who excuse themselves from normally applicable moral requirements. He argues that a cognitive account for ethical failures in leaders provides a better analysis of the issues involved in all the ethical conundrums under the rubric of "toxic leadership". Leaders can know that a certain kind of behavior is generally required by morality but still be mistaken as to whether the relevant moral requirement applies to them in a particular situation and whether others are protected by this requirement. Price demonstrates how leaders make exceptions of themselves, explains how the justificatory force of leadership gives rise to such exception-making, and develops normative protocols that leaders should adopt.

See also

References 
Notes

Bibliography
 Kellerman, Barbara (2004) Bad Leadership: What It Is, How It Happens, Why It Matters Boston, Massachusetts: Harvard Business Review Press. 
 Lipman-Blumen, Jean (2006) The Allure of Toxic Leaders: Why We Follow Destructive Bosses and Corrupt Politicians—and How We Can Survive Them Oxford University Press. 
 Price, Terry L. (2005) Understanding Ethical Failures in Leadership (Cambridge Studies in Philosophy and Public Policy). Cambridge, England: Cambridge University Press. 

Further reading
 Jha, Srirang and Jha, Shweta (June 2015) "Leader as Anti-Hero: Decoding Nuances of Dysfunctional Leadership" Journal of Management & Public Policy
 Warneka, Timothy H. (2005) Leading People the Black Belt Way: Conquering the Five Core Problems Facing Leaders Today. Asogomi Publishing International.
 Whicker, Marcia Lynn (1996) Toxic Leaders: When Organizations Go Bad. Westport, Connecticut: Quorum Books.
 Williams, Christopher (2006) Leadership Accountability in a Globalizing World. London: Palgrave Macmillan.

External links 
 Toxic Management

Strategic management
Positions of authority
Abuse
Workplace bullying
Leadership